Bizaardvark is an American comedy television series created by Kyle Stegina and Josh Lehrman that premiered on Disney Channel on June 24, 2016. The series ran for three seasons consisting of 63 episodes, airing its final episode on April 13, 2019. The series stars Madison Hu, Olivia Rodrigo, Jake Paul, DeVore Ledridge, Ethan Wacker, Maxwell Simkins, and Elie Samouhi. In addition to the series' regular episodes, the series has also aired shorts under the title of Bizaardvark Shorts.

Premise 
Frankie Wong and Paige Olvera are two teenage best friends who post funny songs and comedic videos on the Internet. After hitting 10,000 subscribers on their Vuuugle channel Bizaardvark, a portmanteau of the words "bizarre" and "aardvark", they are accepted into the Vuuugle studios, where they make their videos while also having to share them with other "Vuuuglers". In the third season, Frankie and Paige are among the Vuuuglers who attend the Vuuugle house in Malibu, where they, along with Amelia and Bernie, meet Zane and Rodney, two new Vuuuglers.

Episodes

Cast and characters

Main 
 Madison Hu as Frankie Wong, one star of Bizaardvark who plays the keyboard and piano.
 Olivia Rodrigo as Paige Olvera, the other star of Bizaardvark who plays the guitar.
 Jake Paul as Dirk Mann (seasons 1–2), the star of "Dare Me Bro", where he takes dare requests that he performs.
 DeVore Ledridge as Amelia Duckworth, the star of "Perfect Perfection with Amelia" which details about fashion and self-help tips for girls. By the third season, Amelia changes the name of her series to Imperfect Imperfection in light of her little sister Willow coming to live with her.
 Ethan Wacker as Bernie Schotz, a friend of Frankie and Paige who becomes their agent. He also becomes friends with Dirk and develops a crush on Amelia.
 Maxwell Simkins as Zane (season 3), a new Vuuugle star, Rodney's best friend, and the star of "Zane Unboxed", where he tells stories associated with his unboxing of items.
 Elie Samouhi as Rodney (season 3) a new Vuuugle star, Zane's best friend, and the star of "What's in M'Hair?", where he pulls out different things that are found in his hair.

Recurring 
 Johnathan McClain as Liam, the son of Vuuugle's creator who speaks to the Vuuuglers through a robotic TV screen
 Ellen Ratner as Grandma, the grandmother of Bernie who lives with her and has done a lot of odd jobs in her life
 Maya Jade Frank as Belissa (seasons 1–2), a superfan of Bizaardvark who is the webmaster of the fansite "I Heart Vark"
 Adam Haas Hunter as Viking Guy (seasons 2–3), a tall Viking who is the star of Vuuugle's "Live Like a Viking" Channel
 Rachna Khatau as Principal Karen (seasons 2–3), the principal of Sierra High School seeking the approval of students who later becomes a fan of Bizaardvark like Belissa did
 Kevin Will as Coach Carlson (seasons 2–3), the gym teacher at Sierra High School
 Caitlin Reagan as Willow (season 3), Amelia's younger sister who has developed an earth child lifestyle where she becomes a vegan with the exception of nachos, does yoga forms, likes Earth Day, and boycotted Halloween due to cruelty to pumpkins.
 David Lengel as Lou Scoopmaker (season 3), a news reporter who hosts Malibu's news segment "Lou Scoopmaker's Hot Scoop" and interacts with the Vuuuglers

Ross Kobelak has also appeared as Horse Face Guy, a fellow Vuuugle star who always wears a black horse head mask and never talks, since the beginning of the series.

Production 
The series was created by Kyle Stegina and Josh Lehrman, who were discovered by the Disney Channel Storytellers program. They serve as the series' co-executive producers. Eric Friedman and Ron Rappaport serve as executive producers, with Eric Friedman as showrunner. Marc Warren, who previously supervised Disney Channel Storytellers, was the executive producer on the pilot. The series started shooting in early 2016. On December 15, 2016, Disney Channel renewed the series for a second season. On July 22, 2017, it was announced that Jake Paul would be leaving both Bizaardvark and Disney Channel. On April 19, 2018, Disney Channel publicized that a previously unannounced third season would premiere in summer 2018. On May 30, 2018, it was announced that Maxwell Simkins and Elie Samouhi had joined the series' cast, portraying tween bloggers Zane and Rodney, respectively.

Broadcast 
The series premiered in both the United States and Canada following the premiere of Adventures in Babysitting on Disney Channel and Disney Channel Canada, respectively, on June 24, 2016. The first season concluded on January 27, 2017. The second season premiered on June 23, 2017, and concluded on April 13, 2018. The third season premiered on July 24, 2018, and concluded on April 13, 2019.

Reception

Critical reception 
Owen Gleiberman of Variety stated that the series manages to be innovative for being a quirky and surreal satirical sitcom, while claiming that Madison Hu and Olivia Rodrigo skillfully manage to capture precociousness through their characters with irony. Emily Ashby of Common Sense Media rated the series 3 out of 5 stars, complimented the depiction of positive messages, such as friendship and acceptance, and praised the presence of role models, stating that Hu and Rodrigo's characters portray perseverance and teamwork.

Ratings 
 

| link2             = List of Bizaardvark episodes#Season 2 (2017–18)
| episodes2         = 22
| start2            = 
| end2              = 
| startrating2      = 1.49
| endrating2        = 0.97
| viewers2          = |2}} 
                      
| link3             = List of Bizaardvark episodes#Season 3 (2018–19)
| episodes3         = 21
| start3            = 
| end3              = 
| startrating3      = 0.76
| endrating3        = 0.55
| viewers3          = |2}} 
}}

References

External links 
 

2010s American children's comedy television series
2016 American television series debuts
2019 American television series endings
Disney Channel original programming
English-language television shows
Television series by It's a Laugh Productions